Harpalus liobasis is a species of ground beetle in the subfamily Harpalinae. It was described by Maximilien Chaudoir in 1868.

References

liobasis
Beetles described in 1868